Thomas Barratt VC (5 May 1895 – 27 July 1917) was an English recipient of the Victoria Cross, the highest and most prestigious award for gallantry in the face of the enemy that can be awarded to British and Commonwealth forces.

Barratt was born on 5 May 1895 to James and Sarah Ann Barratt.

He was 22 years old, and a private in the 7th Battalion, The South Staffordshire Regiment, British Army during the First World War when he performed the act for which he was awarded the VC and which led to his death on 27 July 1917 north of Ypres, Belgium

His Victoria Cross is displayed at the Staffordshire Regiment Museum, Whittington Barracks, Lichfield, Staffordshire, England.

He was commemorated in Tipton by a block of flats being named Barratt Court. When these flats were renovated the plaque erected in his memory went missing. A replacement plaque was unveiled at a ceremony in May 2012.

References

External links
Thomas Barratt, Coseley's own VC (biographical details)
Burial location of Thomas Barratt "Belgium"
Location of Thomas Barrett's Victoria Cross "Staffordshire Regiment Museum"

1895 births
1917 deaths
People from Coseley
South Staffordshire Regiment soldiers
British World War I recipients of the Victoria Cross
British Army personnel of World War I
British military personnel killed in World War I
British Army recipients of the Victoria Cross
Burials at Essex Farm Cemetery
Military personnel from Staffordshire